Harry Dennis Madden (January 23, 1895 – November 28, 1945) was a Canadian politician. He represented the electoral district of Queens in the Nova Scotia House of Assembly from 1941 to 1945. He was a member of the Nova Scotia Liberal Party.

Life
Madden was born in 1895 at Amherst, Nova Scotia. He was educated at St. Francis Xavier University and Dalhousie University, and was a druggist by career. He married Marion Campbell in 1924. Madden served as mayor of Liverpool for four years. Madden entered provincial politics in the 1941 election, defeating Conservative incumbent John J. Cameron by 13 votes in the Queens riding. He did not reoffer in the 1945 election. Madden died at Liverpool on November 28, 1945.

References

1895 births
1945 deaths
Dalhousie University alumni
Mayors of places in Nova Scotia
Nova Scotia Liberal Party MLAs
People from Amherst, Nova Scotia
People from Queens County, Nova Scotia
St. Francis Xavier University alumni
20th-century Canadian politicians
Canadian pharmacists